The Carnegie Library of Barnesville, in Barnesville, Georgia, was built in 1910.  It was designed by Whitfield & King.  It was listed on the National Register of Historic Places in 1987. It is now a private home and studio.

References

Library buildings completed in 1910
Libraries on the National Register of Historic Places in Georgia (U.S. state)
Georgian architecture in Georgia (U.S. state)
Buildings and structures in Lamar County, Georgia
Libraries in Georgia (U.S. state)
National Register of Historic Places in Lamar County, Georgia
Houses in Lamar County, Georgia
1910 establishments in Georgia (U.S. state)